T. Sundupalle is a village in Annamayya district of Andhra Pradesh state, India. It is the headquarter of T.Sundupalle mandal as per Rajampeta revenue division. Pincha dam is located at Mudumpadu village . Sangameswara temple is located at Mittameedapalle at the conflux of Pincha and Bahuda rivers.

References

Villages in Kadapa district